Baguigui or Badjigui is a settlement in the Oussouye Department of the Ziguinchor Region in south-west Senegal. At the 2002 census it had 32 inhabitants in 5 households.

References

External links
PEPAM

Populated places in Ziguinchor Region
Casamance